Dieter Schneider (born 20 February 1959) is a German fencer. He competed in the team sabre events at the 1984 and 1988 Summer Olympics.

References

External links
 

1959 births
Living people
German male fencers
Olympic fencers of West Germany
Fencers at the 1984 Summer Olympics
Fencers at the 1988 Summer Olympics
Sportspeople from Koblenz